Askia Ishaq I was the ruler of the Songhai Empire from 1539 to 1549, elected Askia following the death of Askia Isma'il. He was the fifth ruler of the Askiya dynasty which had the town of Gao as its capital.

Ascension to the throne
When Askia Isma'il died, the leading men in the empire peacefully agreed that Ishaq, a son of Muhammad the Great would be the next ruler.

Reign
Askia Ishaq was the most ruthless Songhai ruler ever, inspiring the most fear and anxiety among the Songhai people. Despite being a devout Muslim, he sent agents to Timbuktu on a regular basis to demand enormous sums of money from the merchants, which is against Islamic law. This ended up damaging the economy of the empire and made him unpopular, thus gaining him many enemies. Askiya Ishaq I was completely ruthless as a ruler and executed any official whom he considered as a threat. The Tarikh al-Sudan gives this description: "If he imagined anyone was making the least move against the throne, he would, without exception, have him killed or banished. This was his consistent practice."

Askia Ishaq briefly occupied the Mali Empire capital in 1545 and 1546. 

After a request from the Moroccan sultan Muhammad Al-Arak, to cede the salt mines of Taghaza, Ishaq I sent a group of 2000 mounted men to raid a market town in the Dara valley of southern Morocco with instructions to avoid killing anyone. This was intended as a show of strength.

Askiya Ishaq I died in the town of Kukiya and was buried there. He was succeeded by his brother Askiya Dawud.

Notes

References
.
. Also available from Aluka but requires subscription.

1549 deaths
People of the Songhai Empire
16th-century monarchs in Africa
Year of birth unknown